The 1975 Edmonton Eskimos finished in 1st place in the Western Conference with a 12–4 record and won the 63rd Grey Cup.

Pre-season

Schedule

Regular season

Season Standings

Season schedule

Total attendance: 202,582 
Average attendance: 25,323

Playoffs

Grey Cup

Awards and honours
CFL's Most Outstanding Offensive Lineman Award – Charlie Turner

References

Edmonton Elks seasons
Grey Cup championship seasons
N. J. Taylor Trophy championship seasons
1975 Canadian Football League season by team